Danijel Pranjić (born 2 December 1981) is a Croatian professional football manager and former player. Being a versatile left-footed player, he could play all across the left wing and could also be used as a central midfielder.

Club career
Pranjić started his career at Papuk. He played for NAŠK, Papuk, Belišće, and Osijek before making his move to a bigger stage at Dinamo Zagreb in 2004. While at Dinamo Zagreb, he also played regularly during their 2004–05 UEFA Cup campaign, making six appearances and scoring one goal in the competition.

In 2005, he was transferred to Dutch Eredivisie side SC Heerenveen. His good performances as an offensive winger secured him a return to international football with Croatia in 2007. He started the 2008–09 Eredivisie season well, netting four goals in his first three league matches. Pranjić scored his first hat-trick in the Dutch Cup on 12 November 2008 in a huge 7–0 win against Haaglandia. On 31 January 2009, he made the lone goal in a Heerenveen victory at AFC Ajax. A month later, he scored a late penalty that gave Heerenveen a 3–2 win at PSV.

He won the Dutch Cup with Heerenveen at the end of the 2008–09 season, which turned out to be his last match for the club. In June 2009, Bayern Munich announced Pranjić would join the club. He struggled to make an impact in his first season with the club, starting only 14 matches and losing out to first choice left-back Holger Badstuber. Due to his utility and injuries to other teammates, however, he started an increasing number of games in his second season with the Bavarian club.

On 13 July 2012, after the expiration of his Bayern contract, Pranjić was announced as a new signing for Portuguese Primeira Liga team Sporting CP. He played nine games for Os Leões before joining Spanish La Liga club Celta de Vigo in January 2013 on loan until the end of the season.

On 30 August 2013, Pranjić and Sporting terminated the contract in mutual agreement.

On 2 September 2013, it was officially announced that Pranjić had signed with Panathinaikos for three years. He made his professional debut in a 1–1 away draw against Platanias F.C.

On 11 September 2016, Pranjić joined Slovenian club FC Koper on free transfer.

On 21 July 2017, Pranjić signed with Cypriot club Anorthosis.

On 1 July 2019, Pranjić signed with Ayia Napa, competing in the Cypriot Second Division.

International career
Pranjić started his international career with the Croatian national under-21 football team, winning a total of 15 international caps and scoring one goal for the team between 2002 and 2004.

On 16 November 2004, Pranjić made his full international debut for Croatia in a friendly match against the Republic of Ireland. After two years of absence from the national team, he was called up for a friendly match against Norway in February 2007. Later that year, he also appeared in three UEFA Euro 2008 qualifiers.

Asked to play a defensive role by Croatia coach Slaven Bilić, although still predominantly a midfielder in his club career, Pranjić was the only Croatian to start all four games at the UEFA Euro 2008 finals. Pranjić provided an assist to Darijo Srna to score the opener in Croatia's 2–1 victory over Germany and an assist to Ivan Klasnić to score the only goal in their next game, a 1–0 win over Poland.

He kept his place as a regular in the national team during their unsuccessful qualifying campaign for the 2010 FIFA World Cup, appearing in a total of nine matches.

On 28 September 2012, Pranjić retired from the national team in protest to the call up of Brazilian-born player Sammir.

On 10 November 2013, Kovač called up Pranjić to the national team after Ivan Strinić sustained an injury that made him ineligible for the playoffs against Iceland.

Pranjić was called to the Croatia's 23-man squad for 2014 FIFA World Cup. He earned a total of 58 caps, scoring 1 goal. His last match for Croatia happened at a Euro 2016 qualification match against Azerbaijan in 2015.

Career statistics

Club

International goals
Scores and Results show Croatia's goal tally first

|-
| 1 || 28 March 2015 || Stadion Maksimir, Zagreb, Croatia ||  ||  ||  || UEFA Euro 2016 qualifying
|}

Honours
Heerenveen
 KNVB Cup: 2008–09

Bayern Munich
 Bundesliga: 2009–10
 DFB-Pokal: 2009–10
 DFL-Supercup: 2010
 UEFA Champions League runner-up: 2009–10, 2011–12

Panathinaikos
 Greek Cup: 2013–14

References

External links
 

1981 births
Living people
People from Našice
Association football fullbacks
Association football wingers
Croatian footballers
Croatia under-21 international footballers
Croatia international footballers
UEFA Euro 2008 players
UEFA Euro 2012 players
2014 FIFA World Cup players
NK Belišće players
NK Osijek players
GNK Dinamo Zagreb players
SC Heerenveen players
FC Bayern Munich footballers
FC Bayern Munich II players
Sporting CP footballers
RC Celta de Vigo players
Panathinaikos F.C. players
FC Koper players
Anorthosis Famagusta F.C. players
Ayia Napa FC players
Omonia Psevda players
Croatian Football League players
Eredivisie players
Bundesliga players
La Liga players
Primeira Liga players
Super League Greece players
Slovenian PrvaLiga players
Cypriot First Division players
Cypriot Second Division players
Croatian expatriate footballers
Expatriate footballers in Cyprus
Expatriate footballers in Germany
Expatriate footballers in Greece
Expatriate footballers in the Netherlands
Expatriate footballers in Portugal
Expatriate footballers in Slovenia
Expatriate footballers in Spain
Croatian expatriate sportspeople in Cyprus
Croatian expatriate sportspeople in Germany
Croatian expatriate sportspeople in Greece
Croatian expatriate sportspeople in the Netherlands
Croatian expatriate sportspeople in Portugal
Croatian expatriate sportspeople in Slovenia
Croatian expatriate sportspeople in Spain
Croatian football managers
Croatian expatriate football managers
Expatriate football managers in Cyprus